Harvey Spaulding Clapp (March 13, 1817 – 1889) was an American farmer and legislator.

Born in Moretown, Vermont, Clapp moved to Wisconsin Territory in 1836 and settled in Hudson and was a farmer. He served as County Clerk of St. Croix County, Wisconsin and was a Republican. In 1874, Clapp served in the Wisconsin State Assembly. He died in New Richmond, Wisconsin.

Notes

External links

1817 births
1889 deaths
People from Hudson, Wisconsin
People from Washington County, Wisconsin
Farmers from Wisconsin
County clerks in Wisconsin
Republican Party members of the Wisconsin State Assembly
19th-century American politicians